Årnäs is a village in Arvika Municipality, Värmland County, Sweden.

References

Populated places in Värmland County